A spectacle is an event that is memorable for the appearance it creates.

Spectacle or spectacles may also refer to:

Science and technology
 Spectacle (software), a screenshot software by KDE
 Spectacle, the toolset for packaging maintenance of MeeGo
 Brille, a glassy covering of the eye found in some animals

Arts, entertainment, and media
 Spectacle (band), a 1990s indie pop band
 "Spectacle", a song by Velvet Revolver from Contraband
 Spectacle: Elvis Costello with..., a music show starring Elvis Costello, appearing on the Sundance Channel (United States)
 Spectacles, the autobiography of Sue Perkins
 The Spectacles (short story), by Edgar Allan Poe

Other uses
 Spectacle (critical theory), a central notion in the Situationist theory developed by Guy Debord
 Spectacles (product), camera glasses sold by Snap Inc
 The Spectacles, Western Australia, a suburb of Perth
 Spectacles, eyeglasses
 The spectacle (Abrostola tripartita), a noctuid moth found in Asia and Europe

See also
 Spectacle Island (disambiguation)